In algebraic geometry, the Cremona group, introduced by , is the group of birational automorphisms of the -dimensional projective space over a field  It is denoted by 

The projective general linear group of order , of projective transformations, is contained in the Cremona group of order .

The Cremona group in 2 dimensions

The structure of this group is still not well understood, though there has been a lot of work on finding elements or subgroups of it. 
 showed that the Cremona group is not simple as an abstract group;
Blanc showed that it has no nontrivial normal subgroups that are also closed in a natural topology.
For the finite subgroups of the Cremona group see .

The Cremona group in higher dimensions

There is no easy analogue of the Noether–Castelnouvo theorem as  showed that the Cremona group in  dimension at least 3 is not generated by its elements of degree bounded by any fixed integer.

De Jonquières groups

A De Jonquières group is a subgroup of a Cremona group of the following form . Pick a transcendence basis
It can also be regarded as the group of birational automorphisms of the fiber bundle .

When  and  the De Jonquières group is the group of Cremona transformations fixing a pencil of lines through a given point, and is the semidirect product of 

References

Birational geometry
Group theory